, known in China as Bonk's Adventure Land Kingdom, is an action video game that was released by Hudson Soft for Game Boy on April 22, 1994 in Japan and China (DMG-215 CHN). It is a unique entry in the Bonk series as it consists of multiple mini-games rather than being a standard side-scrolling platformer.

External links 
 GB Genjin Land: Viva! Chikkun Kingdom at The Bonk Compendium (covering all games and references to Bonk series)
 GB Genjin Land - Viva! Chikkun Oukoku at Hardcore Gaming 101

Game Boy-only games
1994 video games
Bonk (series)
Prehistoric life in popular culture
Game Boy games
Video games developed in Japan

Japan-exclusive video games
Single-player video games